Colobothea distincta is a species of beetle in the family Cerambycidae. It was described by Pascoe in 1866. It is known from Mexico and Colombia.

References

distincta
Beetles described in 1866